The 2019 European Race Walking Cup took place on 19 May, 2019. The races were held on a 1 km lap around the city centre in Alytus, Lithuania. It was the last edition to be held under the name European Race Walking Cup before being renamed to European Race Walking Team Championships from 2021 on.

For the first time European Race Walking Cup also included women's 50 km racewalking event.

Medallists

Race results

Men's 20 km

Men's 50 km

Men's 10 km (U20)

Women's 20 km

Women's 50 km

Women's 10 km (U20)

Participation 
256 athletes from 29 countries registered for competition of which 241 eventually started.

References 

Results

External links 
 Event website

European Race Walking Cup
International athletics competitions hosted by Lithuania
European Race Walking Cup
Race Walking Cup
European Race Walking Cup
European Race Walking Cup
Sports competitions in Alytus